The Xhosa people, or Xhosa-speaking people are a Nguni ethnic group whose traditional homeland is primarily the Cape Provinces of South Africa. They are the second largest ethnic group in Southern Africa and are native speakers of the IsiXhosa language.

Presently, approximately nine million Xhosa-speaking people are distributed across the country, and the Xhosa language is Southern Africa's most populous languages. The pre-1994 apartheid system of Bantustans suspended the Xhosa South African citizenship, but assigned them to have self-governing "homelands" (native reserves), namely; Transkei and Ciskei, now both a part of the Eastern Cape Province where most Xhosa remain. Many Xhosa live in Cape Town ( in Xhosa), East London, and Port Elizabeth.

, the majority of Xhosa speakers, approximately 5.3 million, lived in the Eastern Cape, followed by the Western Cape (approximately 1 million), Gauteng (671,045), the Free State (246,192), KwaZulu-Natal (219,826), North West (214,461), Mpumalanga (46,553), the Northern Cape (51,228), and Limpopo (14,225).

Zimbabwe has a small but significant Xhosa-speaking (Mfengu) community, and their language, isiXhosa, is recognised as a national language. This community is based on a diaspora that moved up from the Cape in South Africa upon the establishment of Rhodesia with Cecil Rhodes.

History 

Some archaeological evidence has been discovered that suggests that Xhosa-speaking people have lived in the Cape area since at least the 7th century. The modern Xhosa are a blend of ancient Bantu agro-pastoralists (farmers & pastoralists), Khoi pastoralists & San hunter-gatherers.

Origins

The Xhosa people are partial descendants of ǀXam hunter-gatherers, Khoi pastoralists as well as partial descendants of the ancestors of Ngunis who in ancient times migrated from North Africa to Africa's Great Lakes Region, eventually settling in Southern Africa. Xhosa oral history also mentions a historical settlement called 'Eluhlangeni' believed to have been in East Africa in which the Ngunis lived in for some time before continuing with their migration.

Upon crossing mountains and rivers in South Africa, these farm-working agro-pastoralists brought their cattle and goats with them and absorbed the weaker San groups in the region. They also brought weapons, notably their assegais and their shields and would form groups or chiefdoms and kingdoms mainly in what is now the Eastern Cape.

Kingdom

According to oral tradition, the modern Xhosa Kingdom was founded somewhere before the 15th century by Tshawe (whom the royal clan of the Xhosas is named after) who overthrew his brother Cirha (assisted by his brother Jwarha) with the help of the  clan of the amaMpondomise Kingdom. Tshawe and his army then incorporated formerly independent Nguni clans into the Xhosa Kingdom.

Xhosa identity became political, rather than narrow ethnic, and anyone who accepted the House of Tshawe as rulers became Xhosa.

The Xhosa polity achieved political ascendancy over most of the Cape Khoi extending to the very fringes of the Cape Peninsula.

With the settlement of the Cape by Europeans in 1652, the native populations were gradually pushed eastwards, until, in the 1700s, the borders of the Cape Colony had pushed populations far enough east (with relations between colonist and native significantly broken down) to create a critical mass of hostile population to resist the colonists in the Eastern Cape. This sparked off the Cape frontier wars, which represent some of the longest military resistance to colonialism.

The historical end-result would be the containment of large portions of the Cape native population into native reserves in the Easternmost part of the Cape. However these populations would also continually serve as the labour inside the Cape Colony. These native reserves would be re-branded "homelands" in the 20th century and would only be fully dismantled in 1994 with populations moving back into the wider Cape.

In the 19th century, the Xhosas fought and repulsed many tribes that were escaping the Zulus in Natal, this was during the historical mfecane. Those who were accepted were assimilated into the Xhosa cultural way of life and followed Xhosa traditions. To this day, the descendants of the amaMfengu are part of the Xhosa people and they speak isiXhosa and practice the Xhosa culture .

Xhosa unity and ability to fight off colonial encroachment was to be weakened by the famines and political divisions that followed the cattle-killing movement of 1856–1858. Historians now view this movement as a millennialist response, both directly to a lung disease spreading among Xhosa cattle at the time, and less directly to the stress to Xhosa society caused by the continuing loss of their territory and autonomy.

Some historians argue that this early absorption into the wage economy is the ultimate origin of the long history of trade union membership and political leadership among Xhosa people. That history manifests itself today in high degrees of Xhosa representation in the leadership of the African National Congress (ANC), South Africa's ruling political party in the government.

Language 

Xhosa is an agglutinative tonal language categorized under Bantu linguistic classification. While the Xhosas call their language "isiXhosa", it is usually referred to as "Xhosa" in English. Written Xhosa uses a Latin alphabet–based system. Xhosa is spoken by about 18% of the South African population, and has some mutual intelligibility with Zulu, especially Zulu spoken in urban areas. Many Xhosa speakers, particularly those living in urban areas, also speak Zulu and/or Afrikaans and/or English.

Folklore and religion 
Traditional healers of South Africa include diviners. This job is mostly taken by women, who spend five years in apprenticeship. There are also herbalists, prophets, and healers for the community.

The Xhosas have a strong oral tradition with many stories of ancestral heroes; according to tradition, the leader from whose name the Xhosa people take their name was the first King of the nation. One of Xhosa's descendants named Phalo gave birth to two sons, Gcaleka kaPhalo, the heir, and Rarabe ka Phalo, a son from the Right Hand house. Rarabe was a great warrior and a man of great ability who was much loved by his father. Gcaleka was a meek and listless man who did not possess all the qualities befitting of a future king. Matters were also complicated by Gcaleka's initiation as a diviner, which was a forbidden practice for members of the royal family.

Seeing the popularity of his brother and fearing that he might one day challenge him for the throne, Gcaleka attempted to usurp the throne from his father.
Rarabe came to his father's aid and quelled the insurrection. With the blessing of his father, who provided him retinue, and accompanied him; Rarabe left and settled in the Amathole Mountains region. He then ruled over the various Xhosa clans there and the Right Hand House of the Xhosa Kingdom was founded.

' poetry, called , praises the actions and adventures of chiefs and ancestors.

In Xhosa tradition, the ancestors act as intermediaries between the living and God; they are honoured in rituals in order to bring good fortune. Dreams play an important role in divination and contact with ancestors. Traditional religious practice features rituals, initiations, and feasts. Modern rituals typically pertain to matters of illness and psychological well-being.

Christian missionaries established outposts among the Xhosa in the 1820s, and the first Bible translation was in the mid-1850s, partially done by Henry Hare Dugmore. Xhosa did not convert in great numbers until the 20th century, but now many are Christian, particularly within the African initiated churches such as the Zion Christian Church. Some denominations combine Christianity with traditional beliefs.

Rites of passage 

The Xhosa are a South African cultural group who emphasise traditional practices and customs inherited from their forefathers. Each person within the Xhosa culture has their place which is recognised by the entire community. Starting from birth, a Xhosa person goes through graduation stages which recognise their growth and assign them a recognised place in the community. Each stage is marked by a specific ritual aimed at introducing the individual to their counterparts and also to their ancestors. These rituals and ceremonies are sancrosact to the identity and heritage of the Xhosa and other African descendents. Though some western scholars question the relevance of these practices today, even urbanised Xhosa people do still follow them. These are performed to mark the transition from child to adulthood. Zulus once performed the ritual but King Shaka stopped it because of war in the 1810s. In 2009, it was reintroduced by King Goodwill Zwelithini Zulu, not as a custom, but as a medical procedure to curb HIV infections.

All these rituals are symbolic of one's development. Before each is performed, the individual spends time with community elders to prepare for the next stage. The elders' teachings are not written, but transmitted from generation to generation by oral tradition. The iziduko (clan) for instance—which matters most to the Xhosa identity (even more than names and surnames) are transferred from one to the other through oral tradition. It is so important that two people with the same surname but different clan names are considered total strangers, but two people from the same clan but with different surnames are regarded as close relatives. This forms the roots of ubuntu (human kindness) – a behaviour synonymous to this tribe as extending a helping hand to a complete stranger when in need. Ubuntu goes further than just helping one another – it is so deep that it even extends to looking after and reprimanding your neighbour's child when in the wrong. Hence the saying "it takes a village to raise a child".

One traditional ritual that is still regularly practiced is the manhood ritual, a secret rite that marks the transition from boyhood to manhood, . After ritual circumcision, the initiates live in isolation for up to several weeks, often in the mountains. During the process of healing they smear white clay on their bodies and observe numerous customs.

In modern times the practice has caused controversy, with over 825 circumcision- and initiation-related deaths since 1994, and the spread of sexually transmitted infections, including HIV, via the practice of circumcising initiates with the same blade. In March 2007, a controversial mini-series dealing with Xhosa circumcision and initiation rites debuted on South African Broadcasting Corporation. Titled Umthunzi Wentaba, the series was taken off the air after complaints by traditional leaders that the rites are secret and not to be revealed to non-initiates and women. In January 2014 the website ulwaluko.co.za was released by a Dutch medical doctor. It features a gallery of photographs of injured penises, which sparked outrage amongst traditional leaders in the Eastern Cape. The South African Film and Publication Board ruled that the website was "scientific with great educative value", addressing a "societal problem needing urgent intervention".

Girls are also initiated into womanhood (Intonjane). They too are secluded, though for a shorter period. Female initiates are not circumcised.

Other rites include the seclusion of mothers for ten days after giving birth, and the burial of the afterbirth and umbilical cord near the village. This is reflected in the traditional greeting ?, literally "where is your navel?" The answer "tells someone where you live, what your clan affiliation is, and what your social status is and contains a wealth of undisclosed cultural information. Most importantly, it determines where you belong".

Rituals surrounding umtshato (Xhosa marriage)
Xhosa marriage, is one that is filled with a number of customs and rituals which relate to the upkeep of Xhosa traditional practices. These rituals have been practiced for decades by the Xhosa people and have been incorporated into modern day Xhosa marriages as well. The purpose of the practices is to bring together two different families and to give guidance to the newly wed couple throughout.

Ukuthwalwa
To start off the procedures the male intending to marry goes through  which entails him choosing his future bride and making his intentions of marriage known, however this practice was not done by all the tribes within the Xhosa people. Decades before  would entail legal bridal abduction, where the man could choose a woman of his liking to be his bride and go into negotiations with the family of the bride without her knowledge or consent. She would have to abide to the marriage as per tradition.

Isiduko
Following , the man will then be in discussion with his parents or relatives to inform them of his choice in bride. During this discussion the clan name, of the woman would be revealed and researched. If it were found that the woman and the man share the same clan name they would not be allowed to proceed with the marriage as it is said that people with the same clan name are of the same relation and cannot be wed.

Ikhazi
Once discussions with the family are complete and satisfactory information about the woman is acquired then the family of the man will proceed to appoint marriage negotiators. It is these very negotiators that will travel to the family of the woman to make known the man and his intentions. Once the negotiators reach the family of the woman they will be kept in the kraal, of the woman's family. If the family does not possess a kraal they will simply be kept outside the household as they will not be allowed to enter the household without the acknowledgment and acceptance of the woman's family. The family of the woman will give them a bride-price and a date for which they must return to pay that price. The bride-price is dependent on numerous things such as her level of education, the wealth status of her family in comparison to that of the man's family, what the man stands to gain in the marriage and the overall desirability of the woman. The payment of the bride-price could be in either cattle or money depending on the family of the woman. The modern Xhosa families would rather prefer money as most are situated in the urban cities where there would be no space nor permits for livestock.

Upon return of the man's family on the given date, they will pay the bride-price and bring along gifts of offering such as livestock and alcoholic beverages, to be drunk by the family of the bride. These include slaughtering of the livestock as a grateful gesture to their ancestors as well as pouring a considerable amount of the alcoholic beverages on the ground of the bride's household to give thanks to their ancestors. The groom's family is then welcomed into the family and traditional beer, will be prepared for the groom's family as a token of appreciation from the bride's family.

Ukuyalwa
To solidify their unity the family of the bride will head to the groom's household where the elders will address her with regards to how to carry herself and dress appropriately at her newly found household, this is called . Furthermore, a new name will also be given to her by the women of the groom's family and this name signifies the bond of the two families.

Xhosa burial practices
Burial practices and customs include a specific sequence of events and rituals which need to be performed in order to regard a funeral as dignified. Once the family has been notified that a member has died, the extended family comes together in preparation for the burial of the deceased.

The "" (to accompany) ritual is performed in order to accompany the spirit of the deceased to the land of the ancestors. The local male clan leader or his proxy is the one who facilitates the process.
During this ritual, an animal such as a goat is slaughtered. A larger animal like a cow may also be slaughtered for an important person like a head of the family whilst a goat without a blemish may be slaughtered for others.

Further customs include the emptying the main bedroom of the bereaving family, known as ''. This room is where most of the last respects will be paid by family and friends. The emptying of the room is done in order to create space for extended family members to be able to mourn in the main room. The first family members and/or neighbours to arrive arrange the main bedroom to accommodate this seating arrangement by placing a traditional grass mat or mattress on the floor.

Mourners do not require an invitation to attend a funeral and everyone who can and would like to attend is welcome. This means that the bereaved family has to cater for an unknown number of mourners. Traditionally, mourners were fed with '', which is boiled dried corn and water, and the corn was taken from the family food reserves as well as donated by family members and neighbours. In the 21st century, it is regarded as taboo to feed mourners with '' and, as a result of shame, funeral catering has become a lucrative business for the industry during burial events.

A cleansing ritual is done the day after the burial, in which the bereaved women of the family go to the nearest river to wash all the materials and blankets that were used by the deceased before death. Furthermore, the clothes of the deceased are removed from the house and the family members shave their hair. The shaving of hair is an indication that life continues to spring up even after death.

Traditional diet 
The Xhosa settled on mountain slopes of the Amatola and the Winterberg Mountains. Many streams drain into great rivers of this Xhosa territory, including the Kei and Fish Rivers. Rich soils and plentiful rainfall make the river basins good for farming and grazing making cattle important and the basis of wealth.

Traditional foods include beef, mutton, and goat meat, sorghum, milk (often fermented, called "amasi"), pumpkins, Mielie-meal (maize meal), samp, beans, vegetables, like "rhabe", wild spinach reminiscent of sorrel, "", the sweet sap of an aloe, or "", a mushroom that grows after summer rains.

Xhosa cuisine 

 , slices of unpeeled pumpkins that are cooked in plenty of water.
 , peeled off fresh maize grains, and boiled until cooked. It is eaten as a snack, preferably with salt.
 , a soft porridge made mealie meal. It is usually served for breakfast, with sugar and milk.
 , a citron melon with white insides, eaten either raw or cooked.
 , corn with beans or peas soup
 , fermented porridge [amarhewu], sour, slightly soft than porridge itself, mixed with dry pap [umphokoqo]; was popular in the 1900s.
 , a dish made with free-range chicken.
 , a dish made from white maize and sugar beans, a staple food for the Xhosa people.
 , crumble pap
 , a type of beer made from fermented maize and sorghum.
 , (Amasi)sour milk mixed with umphokoqo, commonly eaten by the Xhosa.
 , a loaf of bread, commonly made with homemade dough. Normally round, from baking pots
 , Wild Spinach/Cabbage called imifino, spinach mixed with mealie meal.
 , a dish made of pumpkin and mielie meal (maize meal)
 , a pumpkin that is cooked before it is fully ripened.

Art 

Traditional crafts include bead-work, weaving, woodwork and pottery.

Traditional music features drums, rattles, whistles, flutes, mouth harps, and stringed-instruments and especially group singing accompanied by hand clapping. There are songs for various ritual occasions; one of the best-known Xhosa songs is a wedding song called "", performed by Miriam Makeba as "Click Song #1". Besides Makeba, several modern groups record and perform in Xhosa.
Missionaries introduced the Xhosa to Western choral singing. "Nkosi Sikelel' iAfrika", part of the National anthem of South Africa is a Xhosa hymn written in 1897 by Enoch Sontonga.

The first newspapers, novels, and plays in Xhosa appeared in the 19th century, and Xhosa poetry is also gaining renown.

Several films have been shot in the Xhosa language.  is a modern remake of Bizet's 1875 opera Carmen. It is shot entirely in Xhosa, and combines music from the original opera with traditional African music. It takes place in the Cape Town township of Khayelitsha. The movie Black Panther also features the Xhosa language.

Xhosa beadwork

Beads are small round objects made of glass, wood, metal, nutshell, bone seed and the likes, which are then pierced for stringing. Before glass beads were introduced, people used natural materials to make beads. Xhosa people relied on the San to sell beads to them through trade or barter exchange. Xhosa people would give hemp to the San in exchange for beads. The beads made by the San were made out of ostrich egg shells which were chipped to small size, bored and polished and strung into sinews. Producing them took a long time, so they were scarce, highly priced, valued and in demand. It is recorded that it was only in the 1930s that the Portuguese introduced glass beads through trade.

Xhosa beadwork and its symbolism

Adornments serve a particular purpose across different cultures as social markers. They are used to ascertain where one belongs to with regards to identity, history and geographical location. They reveal personal information with regards to age and gender and social class as some beads were meant to be worn by royalty. Beadwork creates a sense of belonging and cultural identity and traditions hence people draw their cultural ways of living and meanings, as Xhosa people use them as social markers. Xhosa people believe that the beads also create a link between the living and the ancestors as diviners use them during rituals. Thus beads have some spiritual significance.

Social identities/markers with regards to age, gender, grade, marital status, social rank or role and the spiritual state can be ascertained through Xhosa beadwork. Symbolic references are drawn from the beads through the colour, pattern, formation and motifs. However, it ought to be taken into cognisance that some of these messages are limited to a certain group or between two people. In Xhosa culture beads represent the organisational framework of the people and the rites of passage that people have gone through as the beads are representative of the stages of one's life. Motifs on the beads often used include trees, diamonds, quadrangles, chevrons, triangles, circles, parallel lines that form a pattern that is exclusive to certain age groups. Although the beadwork has some cultural significance with certain motifs having exclusive meanings, the creator of the beadwork has creative control and can create and draw meaning from individual preference. Thus the meanings drawn from the beadwork are not rigidly set.

Among the Thembu (a tribe in the Eastern Cape often erroneously referred to be a Xhosa tribe), after circumcision, the men wore, and still wear, skirts, turbans and a wide bead collar. A waistcoat, long necklaces, throat bands, armbands, leggings and belts are part of his regalia. The dominant colours in the beadwork are white and navy blue, with some yellow and green beads symbolising fertility and a new life, respectively.
Xhosa people regard white as the colour of purity and mediation; white beads are still used as offerings to spirits or to the creator. Amagqirha/diviners use white beads when communicating with the ancestors . These diviners also carry with them beaded spears, which are associated with the ancestors that inspire the diviner; beaded horns; and calabashes, to hold medicinal products or snuff. "Amageza", a veil made of beads, is also part of their regalia, they use these beads by swaying them in someone's eyes so as to induce a trance-like state.

Inkciyo is a beaded skirt that serves as a garment covering the pubic area. Among the Pondo people (Xhosa clan) the beads are turquoise and white in colour. This skirt is worn during a virginity testing ceremony among Xhosa people undergoing their rites of passage into womanhood.

Impempe is a whistle that has a necklace on it. The whistle symbolises one's introduction to adolescence.

Xhosa beadwork and other cultural beadworks have cultural ties, but nowadays beads are also worn as fashion pieces, too, either as cultural appreciation or appropriation. The use of cultural beadworks as fashion pieces means that anyone can wear these pieces without having to belong to that cultural group.

Clothing

The Xhosa culture has a traditional dress code informed by the individuals social standing portraying different stages of life.  The 'red blanket people' (Xhosa people) have a custom of wearing red blankets dyed with red ochre, the intensity of the colour varying from tribe to tribe. Other clothing includes beadwork and printed fabrics.  Although in general, Xhosa lifestyle has been adapted to Western traditions, the Xhosa people still wear traditional attire for special cultural activities. 
The various tribes have their own variations of traditional dress which includes the colour of their garments and beadwork. This allows for different Xhosa groups to be able to be distinguishable from one another due to their different styles of dress. The Gcaleka women, for instance, encase their arms and legs in beads and brass bangles and some also wear neck beads.

Women
Unmarried women often wear wraps tied around their shoulders, leaving their breasts exposed.  Engaged women redden their plaited hair and let it screen their eyes, this was done as a sign of respect for their fiancés. Xhosa women wear some form of headdress to cover their heads as a sign of respect to the head of the family which is either their father or husband. Elderly Xhosa women are allowed to wear more elaborate headpieces because of their seniority.

Description

Incebetha is a small blanket that is used as a bra. It is pinned or adorned with beads. The process of making 'incebetha' is called 'uRhaswa'.
'Ifulu' is a garment that is worn underneath, below the belt.  'Ifulu' is covered by the 'isikhakha' or 'umbhaco' and is made of a blanket. It is also adorned with beads through 'urhaswa'.
'Iqhiya' is a cloth that is fitted to the head and covered with beads. Women then wear a small and light weight blanket on the waist called 'uxakatha'.
Women make bracelets with beads, called 'intsimbi' or 'amaso', which they wear on their feet. 'Intsimbi' or 'amaso' is also worn around the waist. 'Intsimbi' or 'amaso'  is made with small wires or flexible material. 'Imitsheke' is worn on the wrist. A small hand bag is worn called 'ingxowa'.

Men

Xhosa men traditionally filled the roles as hunters, warriors and stockman, therefore animal skin forms an important part of their traditional wear. 
Men often wear goatskin bags in which to carry essentials such as tobacco and a knife. The bag is usually made from skin that had been removed in one piece, cured without removing the hair, and turned inside out.
On special occasions such as weddings or initiation ceremonies, Xhosa men wear embroidered skirts with a rectangular cloth over the left shoulder alternatively, a tunic and strands of beaded necklaces can be worn.

Description
Men wear 'ingcawa' a white and black blanket, adorned with 'ukurhaswa'. Men wear beads around their neck. 'Isichebe' is a short bead while 'Isidanga' is a long bead necklace with different colors. Men wear beads around their wrists and foot called 'amaso'. Beads that are worn on the head are called 'unngqa' or 'igwala'. Men smoke pipes that are decorated by 'ukurhaswa'. The traditional smoking pipes are called 'umbheka phesheya'.

Xhosas in modern society 

Xhosa people currently make up approximately 18% of the South African population. The Xhosa are the second largest cultural group in South Africa, after the Zulu-speaking nation.

Under apartheid, adult literacy rates were as low as 30%, and  studies estimated the literacy level of first-language Xhosa speakers at approximately 50%. There have been advances since then, however.

Education in primary-schools serving Xhosa-speaking communities is conducted in Xhosa, but this is replaced by English after the early primary grades. Xhosa is still considered as a studied subject, however, and it is possible to major in Xhosa at university level. Most of the students at Walter Sisulu University and University of Fort Hare speak Xhosa. Rhodes University in Grahamstown, additionally, offers courses in Xhosa for both mother-tongue and non-mother-tongue speakers. These courses both include a cultural studies component. Professor Russel H. Kaschula, Head of the School of Languages at Rhodes, has published multiple papers on Xhosa culture and oral literature.

The effects of government policies during the years of apartheid can still be seen in the poverty of the Xhosa who still reside in the Eastern Cape. During this time, Xhosa males could only seek employment in the mining industry as so-called migrant labourers. Since the collapse of apartheid, individuals can move freely.

After the breakdown of apartheid, migration to Gauteng and Cape Town has become increasingly common, especially amongst rural Xhosa people.

Notable Xhosa

See also 
List of Xhosa Kings
Xhosa wars
Military history of South Africa
Great Lakes Region
Nguni
List of Xhosa people
Inqawe
Xhosa literature

References

Bibliography
 
Note that the figure mentioned on this page is based upon the number of people speaking Xhosa as their home language, which may be greater or less than the total number of people claiming Xhosa descent. In addition, several million people in the Johannesburg-Soweto region speak Xhosa or Zulu as a second or third language. For a majority of these, the two languages become difficult to distinguish (unsurprising given the extreme closeness of their linguistic relationship).
 Reader, J., 1997. Africa: A Biography of the Continent, Vintage Books, New York, NY, United States of America.
 Kaschula, Russell The Heritage Library of African People: Xhosa, New York: The Rosen Publishing Group, Inc., 1997.

External links 

 People of Africa
 Xhosa History and Society
 2001 Digital Census Atlas
 Xhosa Folklore – a collection of Xhosa folklore collected in 1886.
 Xhosa Google – Google interface in Xhosa
 Wiki Loves Africa 2017

 
 
Ethnic groups in South Africa